Crosskirk Broch was a fortification near the present day hamlet of Crosskirk near Thurso, Caithness, Scotland.  After thorough archaeological exploration it was destroyed in 1972 since the site had become unsafe due to sea erosion.  The site was unusual in having a broch, a large circular fortification, built within an older promontory fortification with a ring wall and blockhouse.

History

Crosskirk was occupied at the end of the Bronze Age.  From the early Iron Age that followed there is carinated pottery that appears to be locally made but is similar to pottery of the same period in southern and eastern England.
A few samples are black-burnished. Uncorrected radiocarbon dates for this pottery are in the 6th and 5th centuries BC.
There seems to be a discontinuity in the middle Iron Age when the buildings were reconstructed and new types of pottery and artifacts were introduced, although variants of some of the older styles continued.  This may be interpreted as being due to the influx of some influential new population.

Further use of local pottery continued into the period of Roman occupation of the south of Scotland in 80-180 AD.
There were also remains of Roman pottery and glassware that may have been Roman in origin. 
A body was buried in a sitting position in the middle of an approximately circular building around the time that the site was abandoned. 
No grave goods were found.

There are traces of two long cist burials in the debris of the broch from some time around 600 AD.
There used to be a stone with a runic inscription at Crosskirk, now lost, 
dating from the period of the Norse raiders in the 9th, 10th and 11th centuries.
Some of the land south of the broch was levelled when St Mary's was built.
In recent times, some of the stones from the broch mound were removed, perhaps for building field dykes.

Structure

The promontory fort predated the broch, which was built inside the older structure.
A gateway that widened towards the outside provided access through the wall.
To the west of the gateway the rampart included a structure like a cell, and then there was a recess in the inner face of the wall.
The outwork continued west, ending in a fence made of flagstones that reached to the cliff edge at Chapel Geo.

Based on radiocarbon dates, the broch was built around 200 BC, and was still in use in the second century AD.
The broch would have given an impression of great strength, rising above the existing defensive wall.
It included a guard cell, an intramural chamber and a stair entrance at ground level. 
Although the wall of the broch was relatively thick, it was poorly built, with a core of earth, rubble and boulders.
This may be interpreted as being an early, experimental broch design.

There were external buildings around the tower that are thought to have been a village, an arrangement found only in northern Scotland. 
These houses were occupied from about the same time as the broch was completed.  During the next two centuries there were a series of changes and repairs to the broch, but they could not overcome its underlying weakness of design, and by the end of that period it would have been in poor shape.  During the same period, house enclosures of the settlement outside the broch but within the rampart were steadily added and improved.
A final phase of occupation and construction took place in the 2nd century AD, when the broch was rehabilitated before being finally abandoned.
During this last period it seems that there was no defensive concern.

Economy

The main crop was barley. Samples found at Crosskirk and Bu also include the seeds of other plants such as fat hen, sorrel and chick weed. This mix was probably deliberate, since the other seeds have medical and nutritional value.  Cattle and some sheep were raised, and were supported through the winters.
The people ate shellfish, particularly limpets, winkles and whelks, and ate seabirds.
At nearby locations there is evidence of deep sea fishing for plaice and cod, and of consumption of venison.
The evidence shows that the community had an ample and varied diet, and was largely self-sufficient.

Excavation and destruction

An 1871 description of the broch said it  
The cliff edge had eroded, partly exposing traces of the north of the wall.
There was a shallow depression around the broch and a low bank on the southwest side that may have been the remains of the outer defense wall.
Coastal erosion was undercutting the cliff, making the site unsafe.  Between 1966 and 1972 Fairhurst and Taylor excavated the ruin.
The remains of the broch were then pushed over the cliff by a bulldozer, the site grassed over, and a memorial cairn erected.

Notes and references
Citations

Sources

Archaeological sites in Caithness
Forts in Scotland
Brochs